Decatur Township is one of the fourteen townships of Lawrence County, Ohio, United States. As of the 2010 census 726, down from 839 at the 2000 census.

Geography
Located in the northwestern part of the county, it borders the following townships:
Washington Township - north
Symmes Township - east
Aid Township - southeast
Elizabeth Township - south
Vernon Township, Scioto County - west
Bloom Township, Scioto County - northwest

No municipalities are located in Decatur Township.

Name and history
Statewide, the only other Decatur Township is located in Washington County.

Government
The township is governed by a three-member board of trustees, who are elected in November of odd-numbered years to a four-year term beginning on the following January 1. Two are elected in the year after the presidential election and one is elected in the year before it. There is also an elected township fiscal officer, who serves a four-year term beginning on April 1 of the year after the election, which is held in November of the year before the presidential election. Vacancies in the fiscal officership or on the board of trustees are filled by the remaining trustees.

Education 
All of Decatur Township's educational services are provided by the Rock Hill Local School District, which provides Pre-K through 12th grades.

References

External links
County website

Townships in Lawrence County, Ohio
Townships in Ohio